Eduardo and Rodriguez Wage War on T-Wrecks is the fourth studio album by Regurgitator, released in July 2001. It was the final studio album released on the East West/Warner label. The album peaked at number 7 on the ARIA Albums Chart.

The singles "Fat Cop" and "Super Straight" made it into Triple J's Hottest 100 for 2001.

Track listing

Charts

Release history

References

2001 albums
East West Records albums
Warner Music Group albums
Regurgitator albums
albums produced by Andy Gill